Kansas City Christian School is a private Christian school located in Prairie Village, Kansas. There are approximately 600 students enrolled from preschool through high school. It was formed on July 5, 1951.

There have been three main campuses over the years, and the current location for the elementary and high school campus is in Prairie Village.

The school offers many athletic programs, including cross-country, soccer, basketball, track, golf, tennis, volleyball, and cheerleading. Those interested in fine arts can participate in band, choir, art, drama, and debate.

Kansas City Christian School is accredited by Association of Christian Schools International and the North Central Association of Colleges and Schools Commission on Accreditation and School Improvement. It belongs to KSHAA and Delaware Valley League (3A), and the Evangelical Council for Financial Accountability.

References 
Delaware Valley League School Directory Delaware Valley League Schools

Christian schools in Kansas
Private high schools in Kansas
Private middle schools in Kansas
Private elementary schools in Kansas
Schools in Johnson County, Kansas